Two Japanese destroyers have been named Sawakaze :

 , a  launched in 1919 and scrapped in 1948
 , a  commissioned in 1983 and stricken in 2010

Japanese Navy ship names